Wesley Lautoa (born 25 August 1987) is a New Caledonian professional footballer who plays as a defender and midfielder. He is of New Caledonian and Wallisian descent.

Career
Born in Épernay, Lautoa began his career in the youth sides of local club RC Épernay Champagne before playing in the youth of L'Entente SSG for one year. In 2004, he returned to RC Épernay Champagne where he earned his first professional caps. After four years with the first team he left the club to join AFC Compiègne. On 26 April 2010, CS Sedan signed the defender from French amateur club Compiègne on a three-year deal.

In July 2017 Lautoa joined Dijon from Lorient.

Player profile 
He is a versatile player and can play in both midfield and defence.

References

External links
 

1987 births
French people of New Caledonian descent
French people of Wallis and Futuna descent
Living people
People from Épernay
Sportspeople from Marne (department)
Association football defenders
Association football midfielders
Ligue 1 players
Ligue 2 players
RC Épernay Champagne players
AFC Compiègne players
CS Sedan Ardennes players
FC Lorient players
Dijon FCO players
New Caledonian footballers
New Caledonian expatriate footballers
Footballers from Grand Est